John William McCloskey (September 19, 1925 – June 1, 2017) was an American basketball player, coach and executive. He served as the head coach of the Portland Trail Blazers and general manager of the Detroit Pistons and Minnesota Timberwolves. As general manager of the Pistons, McCloskey assembled the team that would become known as the "Bad Boys" that won NBA championships in 1989 and 1990.

Biography

Early life
McCloskey was born in Mahanoy City, Pennsylvania on September 19, 1925 to Buelah and Eddie McCloskey. After high school, he attended the University of Pittsburgh, where he played football. He left school to serve in World War II as a lieutenant commanding a landing ship for the Marines. After the war, McCloskey attended the University of Pennsylvania where he played three varsity sports.

Playing career
McCloskey played one game for the Philadelphia Warriors of the NBA during the 1953 season, scoring 6 points in that game.  McCloskey also spent time in Eastern Professional Basketball League (EPBL), including with the Sunbury Mercuries. He was the EPBL Most Valuable Player in 1953 and 1954, and earned four nominations to the All-EPBL First Team (1950, 1952–1954).

Coaching career
McCloskey served as head coach of the University of Pennsylvania from 1956 to 1966, and of Wake Forest from 1966 to 1972. Following that, he served as the head coach of the Portland Trail Blazers from 1972 through 1974, earning a 48–116 win–loss record. He followed this stint as an assistant coach to Jerry West and the Los Angeles Lakers. When West became general manager in 1979, McCloskey felt he had earned the right to become head coach, but Jack McKinney was hired instead.

Front-office career: "Trader Jack"
In 1979, McCloskey became general manager of the Detroit Pistons. Over the next 13 years, "Trader Jack", as he was known, made over 30 trades, constantly upgrading his team to become a true challenger to the Boston Celtics, one of the dominant teams in the NBA's Eastern Conference. His best-known moves were drafting future Hall-Of-Famer Joe Dumars outside the lottery and rebounding champ Dennis Rodman in the second round of the NBA Draft, trading three players for future all-star center and dominant rebounder Bill Laimbeer and trading superstar Adrian Dantley for Mark Aguirre during the 1988–89 season, a move that helped the Pistons win the NBA championship in 1989 and 1990.

After the Chicago Bulls swept the Pistons in the 1991 Eastern Conference Finals, "Trader Jack" made his last moves. He acquired Darrell Walker, Brad Sellers, and Orlando Woolridge, and let go of Vinnie Johnson and James Edwards to try to make the team younger. He drafted Doug Overton in the second round that year (the Pistons had traded their first-round pick away), who did not even play the following season. The Pistons struggled with their chemistry, as key subs like John Salley did not improve their performance, yet they won 48 games. They lost in five games to the New York Knicks in the first round, and McCloskey left the team. He later served in the front offices of the Minnesota Timberwolves (1992–1995), and the Toronto Raptors (2004), the latter on an interim basis.

Personal life
On March 29, 2008, McCloskey had his name honored in Auburn Hills (Home city of The Detroit Pistons at the time), with a banner raised at The Palace of Auburn Hills.

McCloskey had six children. His daughter is the writer Molly McCloskey, whose memoir Circles Around the Sun: In Search of a Lost Brother (2011) recounts the story of the McCloskey family with particular focus on Molly's brother (Jack McCloskey's son), Mike. The family was featured in an article in the September 1953 Ladies Home Journal, as part of a long running series "How America Lives", titled "Meet Mrs. $10,000* Executive in the Home".

In May 2017, it was announced McCloskey had Alzheimer's disease. He died on June 1, 2017.

Head coaching record

College

NBA

|-
|align="left"|Portland
|align="left"|
| 82 || 21 || 61 ||  ||align="center"|5th in Pacific || – || – || – || 
|align="center"|Missed Playoffs
|-
|align="left"|Portland
|align="left"|
| 82 || 27 || 55 ||  ||align="center"|5th in Pacific|| – || – || – || 
|align="center"| Missed Playoffs
|- class="sortbottom"
|align="left"|Career
| || 164 || 48 || 116 ||  || || – || – || – ||

References

External links

 Basketball-Reference.com: Jack McCloskey (as coach)
 Basketball-Reference.com: Jack McCloskey (as player)

1925 births
2017 deaths
American expatriate basketball people in Canada
American men's basketball coaches
American men's basketball players
Basketball coaches from Pennsylvania
Basketball players from Pennsylvania
Deaths from dementia in Georgia (U.S. state)
Deaths from Alzheimer's disease
Detroit Pistons executives
Lancaster Red Roses players
Military personnel from Pennsylvania
Minnesota Timberwolves executives
Penn Quakers baseball coaches
Penn Quakers men's basketball coaches
Penn Quakers men's basketball players
People from Mahanoy City, Pennsylvania
Philadelphia Warriors players
Portland Trail Blazers head coaches
Pottsville Packers players
Shooting guards
Sunbury Mercuries players
Toronto Raptors executives
Wake Forest Demon Deacons men's basketball coaches
United States Navy personnel of World War II
United States Navy officers